The year 1671 in music involved some significant musical events.

Events
March 3 – Opening of the Paris Opera, with the opera Pomone by Robert Cambert. 
Philippe Quinault, Molière and Pierre Corneille, collaborate with Jean-Baptiste Lully on a court entertainment.
Arcangelo Corelli settles in Rome after spending four years studying violin in Bologna.
Maurizio Cazzati is dismissed from his post as Maestro di Cappella in San Petronio, Bologna, as a result of controversy over his alleged failure to enforce the rules of counterpoint, and returns to Mantua where he spends the rest of his career as Maestro di Cappella da Camera to Duchess Isabella.
Ignazio Albertini arrives in Vienna with a letter of recommendation from Johann Heinrich Schmelzer.

Classical music
Johann Georg Ahle – Neues Zehn Geistlicher Arien
Cristofaro Caresana – Sonata à 8 (February 1671)
The Notebook of Anna Maria van Eyl, including compositions by Gisbert Steenwick, Johann Caspar Kerll, Heinrich Scheidemann.
Denis Gaultier – Pièces de Luth sur trois différents modes nouveaux
Andreas Hammerschmidt – Sechsstimmige Fest- und Zeit-Andachten
Giovanni Legrenzi – Op. 8, a collection of sonatas
Guilliaume-Gabriel Nivers – Antiphonarium romanum
Francesco Passarini
Salmi concertati... (Bologna: Giacomo Monti)
Antifone della Beata Vergini a voce sola... (Bologna: Giacomo Monti)
Heinrich Schütz – Meine Seele erhebt den Herren, SWV 494

Opera
Robert Cambert – Pomone (premiered March 3 in Paris)
Antonio Pietro Degli – L'inganno fortunato
Antonio Draghi – L'avidità di Mida
Domenico Freschi & Gasparo Sartorio – Iphide greca
Jean-Baptist Lully – Psyche, LWV 45 (premiered January 17 in Paris)

Births
February 19 – Charles-Hubert Gervais, composer (died 1744)
April 18 – Johann Burchard Freystein, hymn-writer (died 1718)
May 12 – Erdmann Neumeister, hymnologist and priest (died 1756)
May 21 – Azzolino Bernardino della Ciaja, organist, harpsichordist, composer and organ builder (died 1755)
June 8 – Tomaso Albinoni, composer (died 1751)
June 16 – Johann Christoph Bach, musician and composer (died 1721) 
June 30 – Teodorico Pedrini, priest, missionary, musician and composer (died 1746) 
September – Antoine Forqueray, viola da gamba virtuoso and composer (died 1745)
September 7 – Antoine Danchet, French playwright and opera librettist (died 1748)
October 17 – Agostino Piovene, Venetian poet and opera librettist (died 1721)
probable – Robert Valentine, recorder player and composer (died 1747)

Deaths
date unknown – Daniel Farrant, composer, viol player and instrument maker (born 1575)

References

 
Music
17th century in music
Music by year